Occhieppo Superiore is a comune (municipality) in the Province of Biella in the Italian region Piedmont, located about  northeast of Turin and about  southwest of Biella.

Occhieppo Superiore borders the following municipalities: Biella, Camburzano, Muzzano, Occhieppo Inferiore, Pollone, Sordevolo.

References

Cities and towns in Piedmont